Umaymah bint ʿAbd al-Muṭṭalib was a paternal aunt of Islamic prophet Muhammad.

Biography
She was born in Mecca, the daughter of Abd al-Muttalib ibn Hashim and Fatima bint Amr al-Makhzumiya.

She married Jahsh ibn Riyab, an immigrant from the Asad ibn Khuzayma tribe, and they had six children.

 Abd Allah.
 Ubayd Allah.
 Zaynab, later a wife of Muhammad.
 Abd, who was always known as an adult by his kunya, Abu Ahmad.
 Habiba, also known as Umm Habib.
 Hamna.

It is not recorded that Umayma ever became a Muslim, and she did not accompany her children on their Hijra to Medina in 622 CE. She was still alive in 628, when Muhammad assigned her an annual pension of 40  of dates from Khaybar.

References

Family of Muhammad
Banu Hashim
6th-century Arabs